David Harum is an American old-time radio soap opera. It was broadcast on CBS, Mutual, and NBC. It ran from January 27, 1936, to January 5, 1951.

Background
Edward Noyes Westcott wrote the novel David Harum, which was published in 1898. That book became the basis for the David Harum radio program and for films of the same name made in 1915 and in 1934. The character was based on the real-life David Hannum, "a flamboyant banker, farmer, and horse trader", who lived in Homer, New York.

Format
The title character was a banker in Homeville, a village in New England. A confirmed bachelor, David Harum had a helpful disposition and "exposed sinister mavericks that were determined to take advantage of local denizens."

In The Great Radio Soap Operas, Jim Cox wrote:David Harum was a ray of sunshine to the downtrodden masses in his community. Never bewildered by those who used evil means to gain fortune at the expense of the weak, he vigilantly pursued piety. He was the epitome of rectitude within the heart and soul of small-town America. Even those incessant giveaways that brought his shows into listeners' homes could never diminish the character that personified this kindly little country philosopher. In him, perhaps, his most devoted fans saw something that they too had always wanted to be.

In another book, Radio Crime Fighters: More Than 300 Programs from the Golden Age, Cox described Harum as "a private eye in banker's clothing" who "set out to right the wrongs that were perpetrated against his invariably vulnerable townsfolk."

Personnel
Characters on David Harum and the actors who portrayed them are shown in the table below:

Frank and Anne Hummert produced the program. Directors were Martha Atwell, Himan Brown, John Buckwalter, Arthur Hanna, Ed King, and Lester Vail. Writers were Peggy Blake, John DeWitt, Noel Gerson, Charles J. Gussman, Johanna Johnson, and Mary W. Reeves. Music was by Stanley Davis. The announcer was Ford Bond.

Schedule
The broadcast schedule for David Harum is shown in the table below.

Sponsor and promotions
David Harum was sponsored by Bab-O household cleaner. During its first nine years of sponsoring the program, Bab-O rose from seventh place among household cleaners to be the leader as measured by dollar volume of sales.

David Harum was among the earliest radio programs to offer premiums to listeners as a way of measuring the show's popularity. In one instance, packets of seed were offered to anyone who sent in 10 cents and a label from the sponsor's product. The 275,000 responses "delighted sponsors and convinced many stations to carry the program." At another time, members of the audience were invited to submit suggestions for a name for Harum's horse, and more than 400,000 responded. The Encyclopedia of Radio noted that David Harum was one of the first radio programs in which products were promoted by the star rather than the announcer.

In 1938, Bab-O's manufacturer, B.T. Babbitt, ventured away from cleaning products to introduce David Harum dog food. Purchasers could obtain a dog leash for 75 cents and a product label and/or a collar for 25 cents and a label. In 1943, Babbit introduced Aunt Polly's Soup Mix, which was named after one of the program's characters. The mix was introduced to coincide with a soup-making project with which Aunt Polly was involved on the program.

Another promotion invited listeners to "actually have a bit of Ireland —- a piece of stone from Blarney Castle grounds — to wear ... as one of four charms of a lovely golden colored bracelet" by sending a Bab-O label with 25 cents. An on-air promotional announcement noted that the bracelet is "like the bracelets David is having made for June Saunders in our story. But it's real." The promotion resulted in 300,000 labels and quarters being submitted in 10 days.

Notes

References

External links

Logs
Log of episodes of David Harum from radioGOLDINdex

Magazine articles
 David Harum in Living Portraits photo feature in the January 1942 issue of Radio and Television Mirror
Through the Years with David Harum photo feature in the December 1948 issue of Radio and Television Mirror

Streaming
Streaming episodes of David Harum from Old Time Radio Researchers Group Library

1936 radio programme debuts
1951 radio programme endings
1930s American radio programs
1940s American radio programs
1950s American radio programs
CBS Radio programs
Mutual Broadcasting System programs
NBC radio programs
American radio soap operas